Anthony Balaam (born July 9, 1965), known as The Trenton Strangler, is an American serial killer who raped and murdered four prostitutes between 1994 and 1996 in Trenton, New Jersey, luring them with sex-for-drugs encounters. Balaam was captured after his would-be fifth victim escaped, and he was later given a life sentence for his crimes.

Early life
Balaam, a native of Trenton, lived at 421 Stuyvesant Avenue with a roommate at the time of the killings. Although a crack user, he had a ten year relationship with a woman who bore him two children and was described as an unassuming, polite and soft-spoken young man. He did not interact much with his neighbors, and from July 1995 to January 1996, he moved temporarily to Detroit, before returning to Trenton. Before his capture, he was arrested on several occasions for drug offences and burglary.

Murders
Balaam's modus operandi was to cruise around the streets, within two miles of his home, looking for potential victims. He would approach sex workers in the early hours of the day, offering them crack in exchange for sex, and when they moved to an isolated location, he pulled out a knife and threatened them before proceeding to rape and then strangle them. Three of the bodies were disposed of in vacant lots, while the last one was left in a rundown hotel. His would-be fifth victim had managed to escape after being raped on February 16, and at least one other woman had managed to flee unharmed.

The victims were as follows:
 Karen Denise Patterson (41) – October 24, 1994
 Valentina Cuyler (29) – March 19, 1995
 Connie Hayward (27) – April 10, 1995
 Debora Ann Walker (37) – July 29, 1996

Arrest, trial and sentence
On the morning of July 29, 1996, Catherine Emerson, a neighbor of Balaam's, was contacted and informed to go look outside by another neighbor. Upon doing so, she found the body of a small-framed woman, lying on the grass at a nearby lot. The police were informed, quickly determining that the body belonged to Walker. Soon after, another body was found in the vicinity. Both of the women had been raped before death, and DNA testing on the semen pointed to Balaam.

He was swiftly arrested, but remained calm and collected, speaking to the detectives in a polite manner. Balaam admitted responsibility for the stranglings, describing about the rage and power he felt while slowly strangling the women. His guilt was confirmed by being identified by the woman who had evaded him.

Before bringing him to court, investigators contacted with their colleagues in Detroit in order to determine whether Balaam might have committed murders there. A homicide investigator from the city denied that Balaam was a suspect in any unsolved cases in or around the area. With this cleared up, the trial began, charging him with the murders, in addition to robbery and possession of illegal weapons. After a five-year-long trial, Anthony Balaam was convicted and sentenced to life imprisonment, with a minimum of 120 years. He will not become eligible for parole until August 4, 2116.

See also 
 List of serial killers in the United States

References

External links
 State v. Balaam

1965 births
20th-century American criminals
American male criminals
American people convicted of murder
American prisoners sentenced to life imprisonment
American rapists
American serial killers
Living people
Male serial killers
People convicted of murder by New Jersey
People from Trenton, New Jersey
Prisoners sentenced to life imprisonment by New Jersey